Chuck Kyle (born November 22, 1950) is an English teacher at St. Ignatius High School in Cleveland, Ohio, and an American football coach. Since 1983 he has coached at Saint Ignatius, owning an overall record of 353-90-1 (.797) and a mark of 72-18 (.800) in Ohio state playoffs. He has led the St. Ignatius Wildcats to a state-record 11 Division I State Titles: 1988, 1989, 1991, 1992, 1993, 1994, 1995, 1999, 2001, 2008, and 2011. Kyle's Wildcats have also won National Championships in 1989, 1993, 1995, and 2008. In 2018, Kyle was named the 6th greatest high school football coach of all time in a computerized ranking by MaxPreps.

References 

For St. Ignatius football coach Chuck Kyle, it's about being part of one team, one school: Terry Pluto

1950 births
Living people
High school football coaches in Ohio
John Carroll University alumni
Sportspeople from Cleveland